

Key
 The list is ordered first by date of debut, and then if necessary in alphabetical order.
 Appearances as a substitute are included.
 Statistics are correct up to and including the match played on 12 August 2020. Where a player left the club permanently after this date, his statistics are updated to his date of leaving.

Players

References
General
 
 

Specific

Western Sydney Wanderers FC players
Western Sydney Wanderers
Association football player non-biographical articles